Stephen Lett (4 April 1847 – 11 October 1905) was born in Ireland but raised and educated in Canada. He became a physician and was the superintendent of an asylum. He was also a well known medical writer.

References
 Biography at the Dictionary of Canadian Biography Online

1847 births
1905 deaths
Canadian psychiatrists
Canadian medical writers